KMUV-LD (channel 23) is a low-power television station licensed to Monterey, California, United States. It is a translator of CBS/Fox/Telemundo affiliate KION-TV (channel 46, also licensed to Monterey) which is owned by the News-Press & Gazette Company. KMUV-LD's transmitter is located on Fremont Peak; its parent station maintains studios on Moffett Street in Salinas immediately south of Salinas Municipal Airport.

History
As KMUV-LP, the station was previously a Univision affiliate; it switched to Telemundo by 2005, when Clear Channel Communications acquired the station. The KMUV call sign had previously been assigned to channel 31 in Sacramento from 1974 until 1981; that station is now KMAX-TV.

Sale to Cowles Publishing Company
On April 20, 2007, Clear Channel Communications (now iHeartMedia) entered into an agreement to spin off its entire television stations group to Newport Television, a broadcasting holding company founded by the private equity firm Providence Equity Partners. The sale was finalized on March 14, 2008. However, Newport Television could not keep KION-TV or KMUV-LP due to Providence Equity Partners' partial ownership of several media properties which serve parts of the market. KION and KMUV were sold to the Cowles Publishing Company, the owner of KHQ-TV and The KHQ Television Group in Spokane, Washington. The sale was finalized on May 7, 2008. On that day, Cowles took over the LMA for KCBA from Newport Television.

Sale to News-Press & Gazette Company
On September 20, 2013, News-Press & Gazette Company announced that it would purchase KION-TV and KMUV-LP, as well as San Luis Obispo sister station KKFX-CA. NPG will also take over some of the operations of Santa Maria sister station KCOY-TV, which Cowles will retain, under a shared services agreement (as NPG's holdings in the area already include KEYT-TV in Santa Barbara). The sale was completed on December 13.

Subchannels
The station's digital signal is multiplexed:

References

External links

KMUV-LP/KION-TV/KKFX-CA Asset Purchase Agreement

CBS network affiliates
Fox network affiliates
Telemundo network affiliates
Dabl affiliates
Low-power television stations in the United States
MUV-LD
Television channels and stations established in 1989
1989 establishments in California
MUV-LD
News-Press & Gazette Company